The canton of L'Yssandonnais is an administrative division of the Corrèze department, south-central France. It was created at the French canton reorganisation which came into effect in March 2015. Its seat is in Objat.

It consists of the following communes:
 
Ayen
Brignac-la-Plaine
Chabrignac
Concèze
Juillac
Lascaux
Louignac
Objat
Perpezac-le-Blanc
Rosiers-de-Juillac
Saint-Aulaire
Saint-Bonnet-la-Rivière
Saint-Cyprien
Saint-Cyr-la-Roche
Saint-Robert
Saint-Solve
Segonzac
Vars-sur-Roseix
Vignols
Voutezac
Yssandon

References

Cantons of Corrèze